Rhabdoherpia is a genus of solenogaster of uncertain relationship within the order Sterrofustia.

Sterrofustia